Malevolent Creation is an American death metal band from Buffalo, New York. Formed in late 1986, the group originally consisted of rhythm guitarist Phil Fasciana, vocalist Brett Hoffman, lead guitarist Jim Nickles, bassist Jason Blachowicz and drummer Dennis Kubas. The band's current lineup features Fasciana, bassist Josh Gibbs (since 2017), drummer Ronnie Parmer (since 2020), and vocalist/lead guitarist Deron Miller (since 2022).

History

1986–1997
Phil Fasciana, Brett Hoffman and Jim Nickles formed Malevolent Creation in late 1986, writing songs as a trio for "10 months or so", before adding Jason Blachowicz and Dennis Kubas to record the band's first demo in September 1987. Shortly after its release, the group relocated to Florida and replaced Nickles, Blachowicz and Kubas with Jon Rubin, Scott O'Dell and Lee Harrison, respectively, who recorded a live demo in early 1989. Blachowicz returned for a studio demo later in the year, before Mark van Erp and drummer Mark Simpson joined for the band's fourth demo in 1990. When the band recorded its debut studio album The Ten Commandments in early 1991, van Erp had been replaced by the returning Blachowicz; Rubin left during the sessions, with his replacement Jeff Juszkiewicz overdubbing some lead guitar parts.

For 1992's Retribution, Juszkiewicz and Simpson were replaced by Rob Barrett and Alex Marquez of Solstice. In early 1993, Barrett left Malevolent Creation to join Cannibal Corpse. He was replaced by a returning Jon Rubin. Marquez also briefly left around the same time, replaced by Larry Hawke, but returned in time to perform on the recording of Stillborn later in the summer. After a European tour at the beginning of 1994, founding vocalist Hoffmann left Malevolent Creation. Blachowicz subsequently took over on vocals, and later in the year the band recorded Eternal with new drummer Dave Culross. By the end of 1995, Culross had been replaced by Derek Roddy, who Fasciana claimed was "way sicker" than his predecessor. Rubin also left shortly thereafter, replaced briefly by Jason Hagen during writing for In Cold Blood.

Before recording for In Cold Blood began, Hagen was fired after falling out with Roddy. His place was taken by John Paul Soars, who performed on the album. Shortly after In Cold Blood was completed and released, Roddy was also fired after falling out with Blachowicz, with Tony Laureano taking over on drums for the album's promotional tour. Just before a European tour starting in August 1997, Soars left the band to focus on his regular job. He was replaced by the returning Rob Barrett, who had just left Cannibal Corpse; after the tour ended in October, Blachowicz left following a fight with Fasciana.

1998–2009
After a brief hiatus, during which time Phil Fasciana considered disbanding the group, Malevolent Creation returned with former members Bret Hoffmann and Dave Culross back in the lineup, joined by new bassist Gordon Simms. With their original vocalist, the band released The Fine Art of Murder in 1998 and Envenomed in 2000, before parting ways with Hoffmann again in January 2002 due to his ongoing problems with drug and alcohol abuse. He was replaced with Kyle Symons, frontman of Fasciana and Barrett's side project Hateplow. For a European tour starting in March, Culross was replaced by Gus Rios. In June, the group announced that it would be recording its next album The Will to Kill with Justin DiPinto on drums. By the end of the year, DiPinto himself had been replaced by Ariel Alvarado as touring drummer.

Starting in March 2003, Tony Laureano returned to Malevolent Creation on a temporary touring basis. He was briefly replaced by Rios in the summer for a planned tour of Brazil, but returned for the shows when they were postponed until September. In November, the group announced the return of Dave Culross for a third tenure. In July 2004 the band released Warkult, before Barrett and Simms were replaced in October 2005 by returning members Jon Rubin and Jason Blachowicz, respectively. By December, the group had announced a reunion with Bret Hoffmann for a European tour at the beginning of 2006, for which they would also be joined by bassist Marco Martell and drummer David Kinkade – bandmates of Blachowicz in Divine Empire. After the tour's conclusion, Symons did not return and Hoffmann remained.

The band announced that it would be recording a new album during 2006 with drummer Tony Laureano, however he later stated that he was unable to take part due to "various scheduling conflicts". In his place, Dave Culross returned for a fourth spell. After recording and touring in promotion of Doomsday X, Culross left again in September 2007 for undisclosed reasons. The band also revealed that Blachowicz had left, claiming that both departing members "have prior job obligations and could not try to work things out". The following month, Marco Martell and Fabian Aguirre were unveiled as the replacements on bass and drums, respectively. By September 2008, Blachowicz had returned. At the same time, Martell took over from Rubin on lead guitar and Gus Rios replaced Aguirre on drums, and they returned to touring.

Since 2009
In July 2009, Gio Geraca took over as Malevolent Creation's touring bassist. He became a permanent band member later in the year. When lead guitarist Martell left at the beginning of 2010, Geraca took over his role for the recording of the group's next album Invidious Dominion. By June, Blachowicz had returned yet again to take over on bass. This lineup of Hoffmann, Geraca, Fasciana, Blachowicz and Rios remained stable for almost four years, before Rios left in February 2014 due to "personal differences". He was replaced in July by another returning member, Justin DiPinto. The new lineup recorded the band's next album Dead Man's Path, which was released in September 2015. After cancelling a US tour in promotion of the album, the band went on an unofficial hiatus in starting October 2016.

After just over a year away, Malevolent Creation resurfaced in November 2017, with constant member Phil Fasciana joined in the new lineup by vocalist and guitarist Lee Wollenschlaeger, bassist Josh Gibbs, and drummer Phil Cancilla. On July 7, 2018, founding vocalist Bret Hoffmann died of colorectal cancer. The new lineup of the band recorded The 13th Beast'', which was released in January 2019. Just over a year later, in April 2020, Wollenschlaeger and Cancilla were replaced by Ryan Taylor and Ronnie Parmer, respectively. Taylor was replaced by former CKY frontman Deron Miller in October 2022.

Members

Current

Former

Touring

Timeline

Lineups
Note: Bold text indicates a new member in the lineup.

References

Malevolent Creation